Jan Berg may refer to:

Jan Berg (politician) (1941–2020), Norwegian politician
Jan Berg (footballer, born 1943) (1943–2005), Norwegian footballer who played for FK Lyn
Jan Berg (footballer, born 1965), Norwegian footballer who played for Molde FK
Jan Berg (Finnish footballer) (born 1985), Finnish footballer

See also
John Berg (disambiguation)
Berg (surname)